The 1972 ABC Under-18 Championship for Women was the second edition of the Asian Basketball Confederation (ABC)'s junior championship. The games were held at Manila, Philippines from December 10–December 20, 1972.

 were able to retain the championship by sweeping all of their assignments, blasting , 85-59, in the final day.

Results

Final standing

Awards

References

1972
Under
1972 in women's basketball
International women's basketball competitions hosted by the Philippines
1972 in Philippine basketball
Bask